Susan Dunklee (born February 13, 1986, in Newport, Vermont) is an American biathlete.

Life and career
Dunklee was raised in the town of Barton, Vermont and started skiing at the age of two, first entering cross-country competitions at the age of seven. She attended St. Johnsbury Academy, in St. Johnsbury, Vermont for high school. She took up biathlon while she was a senior at Dartmouth College, where she studied ecology. While at Dartmouth, Dunklee was also a member of Dartmouth's 2007 National Championship Ski team and was active in the Dartmouth Outing Club. Prior to this she had been a double All-American in cross-country skiing. Her best World Cup finish was 2nd in a Sprint event in Presque Isle, ME in 2016.

At the 2012 Biathlon World Championships in Ruhpolding, Dunklee set a new World Championship best with a fifth place in the individual event.

On November 22, 2013, Dunklee was named to the American team for the 2014 Winter Olympics.

Susan's father, Stan Dunklee, was a former NCAA cross-country skiing champion and competed at the 1976 and 1980 Winter Olympics, while her uncle Everett Dunklee competed in cross-country skiing at the 1972 Winter Olympics.

On February 19, 2017, Dunklee finished 2nd in the Mass Start at Hochfilzen in the 2017 Biathlon World Championships, winning her first World Championship medal. This made her the first American woman to win an individual medal at an Olympics or World Championships in biathlon. It also made her the first woman and second person overall, after Lowell Bailey, to qualify for the next US Olympic team.

She has qualified to represent the United States at the 2022 Winter Olympics.

Biathlon results
All results are sourced from the International Biathlon Union.

Olympic Games

World Championships

*During Olympic seasons, competitions are only held for those events not included in the Olympic program.

References

External links

1986 births
Living people
Sportspeople from Vermont
American female biathletes
Biathletes at the 2014 Winter Olympics
Biathletes at the 2018 Winter Olympics
Biathletes at the 2022 Winter Olympics
Olympic biathletes of the United States
Biathlon World Championships medalists
21st-century American women
People from Orleans County, Vermont